Wereldhave N.V. is a Dutch real estate investment company founded in 1930, headquartered in the World Trade Center at Amsterdam Airport Schiphol. The company focuses on investments in commercial property. In 2010 the firm recorded a profit of €89 million, against a market capitalisation of around €1.6 billion. Real estate properties are located predominantly in the Netherlands, Finland, United Kingdom, United States, Belgium, France, and Spain. Wereldhave is listed at Euronext Amsterdam and forms part of the AMX index.

External links

References

Real estate companies of the Netherlands